Charley Fusari born Calogero Fusari (August 20, 1924 – November 4, 1985) was an Italian-American boxer born in Italy. 

Fusari was born in Alcamo, in the Province of Trapani and emigrated to the US with his family when a boy.
 

Charlie fought 92 bouts, 8 amateur and 84 “pro”;he was the New Jersey State Champion in 1947, ’48 and ’49, becoming a professional boxer on May 8, 1944; he fought against greats boxers of his time such as Rocky Graziano, Tony Janiro, Sugar Ray Robinson.
Charley was a good fighter and won all his first 45 fights: in his 45th fight, he beat the great Tippy Larkin. Fusari suffered from impaired hearing. With his ring earnings he bought a milk delivery business for his family. Fusari as a result became known as the Irvington milkman. :

Fusari had two world title shots during his career. He lost a one-sided decision to defending welterweight champion Sugar Ray Robinson on August 9, 1950 and lost a split decision to Johnny Bratton for the vacant National Boxing Association World welterweight title on March 14, 1951 after Robinson had left the title after winning the world middleweight title from Jake LaMotta a month earlier.

He defeated such boxers as Attilio "Rocky Castellani, Maxie Berger, Freddie Archer, Pat Demers, Al "Red" Priest, Terry Young, Joey Carkido, Jimmy Flood, Frankie Palermo, Vince Foster and Tony Pellone.

He retired from boxing in 1952.

References

Sources

External links
http://boxrec.com/en/boxer/11210

1924 births
1985 deaths
American people of Italian descent
Italian emigrants to the United States
People from Alcamo
Welterweight boxers
American male boxers
Sportspeople from the Province of Trapani